Calypsoinae is an orchid subtribe in the tribe Epidendreae of subfamily Epidendroideae. It has previously been recognized as tribe Calypsoeae in the subfamily Epidendroideae.

Genera
Genera recognized in Chase et al.'s 2015 classification of Orchidaceae:
 Aplectrum
 Calypso
 Changnienia
 Coelia
 Corallorhiza
 Cremastra
 Dactylostalix
 Danxiaorchis
 Ephippianthus
 Govenia
 Oreorchis
 Tipularia
 Yoania

See also
 Taxonomy of the Orchidaceae

References

External links

 
Epidendroideae tribes